Colin Roper (born 25 July 1936) is a former English cricketer.  Roper was a right-handed batsman who fielded as a wicket-keeper.  He was born at Litton Cheney, Dorset.

Roper made a single first-class appearance for Hampshire against Oxford University at the University Parks in 1957.  Oxford University won the toss and elected to bat first, making 317 for 8 declared in their first-innings, during which Roper took a single catch behind the stumps, to dismiss Richard Jowett off the bowling of Malcolm Heath.  In response, Hampshire made 229 all out in their first-innings, during which Roper scored 7 runs, before he was dismissed by Jack Bailey.  Oxford University declared in their second-innings on 151 for 4, with Hampshire then reaching 137 for 5 in their second-innings, at which point the match was declared a draw.  This was his only major appearance for Hampshire.

He later played for Dorset, making his debut for the county in the 1959 Minor Counties Championship against Berkshire.  He made 79 further appearances for the county in the Minor Counties Championship, the last of which came against the Somerset Second XI in 1969.  He also made a single List A appearance for Dorset in the 1968 Gillette Cup against Bedfordshire at Sherborne School.  Batting at number three in the batting order, Roper was dismissed for a duck by Bill Bushby, with Bedfordshire winning the match by 8 wickets to progress to the next round.

References

External links
Colin Roper at ESPNcricinfo
Colin Roper at CricketArchive

1936 births
Living people
People from West Dorset District
Cricketers from Dorset
English cricketers
Hampshire cricketers
Dorset cricketers
Wicket-keepers